Isserlis, Isserles or Iserles, and Isserlin, Isserlen or Isserlein are patronymic Yiddish surnames, originating in Ashkenazic and Sephardic rabbinical families. The name is derived from French or German diminutive variations of the Hebrew given name Israel.

Surname
Arieh Iserles (born 1947), computational mathematician
Eleanor Isserlis (born Eleanor Mary Ord Laurie, 1919-?), was a British mammalogist 
Julius Isserlis (1888–1968), Russian pianist and composer, grandfather of Steven Isserlis
Inbali Iserles, writer of juvenile fantasy novels under the pseudonym Erin Hunter
Israel Isserlein (1390–1460), talmudist and halakhist from Austria
Leon Isserlis (1881–1966), Russian-born British statistician
Moses Isserles (1530–1572), Polish Ashkenazic rabbi and talmudist
Steven Isserlis (born 1958), British cellist

Other
Isserlis' theorem, a formula in probability theory named after Leon Isserlis

References

Patronymic surnames
Jewish surnames
Sephardic surnames